The Davis House is a historic house at the corner of Wolf Street and Arkansas Highway 5 in Norfork, Arkansas.  It is a vernacular Plain-Traditional -story frame structure, with a hip roof and a stucco foundation.  It has a hip-roofed porch extending across its front, and shed-roof dormers piercing its distinctive pyramidal roof on two elevations.  The house was built c. 1928 for Charley Blevins, but was owned for about 50 years by members of the Davis family.

The house was listed on the National Register of Historic Places in 1995, for its architectural uniqueness.

See also
National Register of Historic Places listings in Baxter County, Arkansas

References

Houses on the National Register of Historic Places in Arkansas
Houses completed in 1928
Houses in Baxter County, Arkansas
National Register of Historic Places in Baxter County, Arkansas
1928 establishments in Arkansas